was a Japanese film director, who directed over 160 films during his career.

Biography

Early years
Shimizu was born in Shizuoka Prefecture and attended Hokkaidō University, but left before graduating. He joined the Shochiku film studio in Tokyo in 1921, making his directorial debut in 1924 at the age of just 21.

Career
Shimizu specialised in melodramas and comedies. In his most distinguished silent films like Fue no Shiratama (1929) and Japanese Girls at the Harbor (1933), he explored a Japan poised between native and Western ideas, traditionalism and liberalism, while stylistically relying on modernist and avant-garde techniques. The majority of his silent films is nowadays considered lost.

In the 1930s, Shimizu increasingly took advantage of shooting on location and with non-professional actors, and was praised at the time by film critics such as Matsuo Kishi and fellow directors as Kenji Mizoguchi. Mr. Thank You (1936), The Masseurs and a Woman (1938) and Ornamental Hairpin (1941) portrayed small groups and communities of travelers or spa residents which, as film historian Alexander Jacoby points out, "concentrated more on the delineation of character than on plot". For critic Chris Fujiwara, this "unpredictability and plotlessness", in combination with the extensive use of a mobile camera, gives Shimizu's films of this era a "strikingly modern quality".

Shimizu also explored themes of maternal self-sacrifice and fallen female roles, common themes in Japanese cinema at the time. In films like Forget Love for Now (1937) and Notes of an Itinerant Performer (1941), his heroine was accepting the burden of supporting a male dependent or relative to afford him the opportunity to go to school or become successful in life. Forget Love for Now in particular was "critical of the double standard which expects women to sacrifice everything for the sake of their male dependents, while indulging in moralistic condemnation of the methods they are required to adopt to do so" (Jacoby).

Shimizu's reputation as a director has often been associated with films about children, especially Children in the Wind (1937) and Four Seasons of Childhood (1939). His experiences with child orphans after World War II led to the film Children of the Beehive (1948), independently produced by the director himself, which Jacoby calls a "masterpiece of neo-realism". Shimizu's films featured children who do not love or are unloved by their parents, children that are rejected by their peers or become social outcasts, or ones that suffer from illness and disability. While the premise of the stories differed, a common theme often persisted: Shimizu utilised individuals who are excluded from a group as a social commentary and criticism of society through the group themselves.

Films like Children in the Wind and Ornamental Hairpin have also, in retrospect, been interpreted as Shimizu's attempts to escape the realities of wartime Japan (one critic even attacked Ornamental Hairpin for wasting valuable film stock). The pressure put on Shimizu by the authorities to contribute to the war effort resulted in films like Introspection Tower (also titled The Inspection Tower, 1941) and Sayon's Bell (1943). After the war, having left Shochiku, Shimizu directed films for his own production company and the Shintoho and Daiei studios. Notable works of this era, in addition to Children of the Beehive, are Children of the Great Buddha (1952) and The Shiinomi School (1955).

Shimizu lived with actress Kinuyo Tanaka from 1927 to 1929. He died of a heart attack on 23 June 1966 at the age of 63, seven years after directing his last film.

Filmography

Legacy
Archive copies of Shimizu's extant films have been shown at the Cinémathèque française, the Museum of Modern Art, the Berlin International Film Festival, and other institutions and festivals.

In 2008, Shochiku released two box sets which include eight of his films (Region 2 format, with both Japanese and English subtitles). The first box set contained the films Japanese Girls at the Harbor, Mr. Thank You, The Masseurs and a Woman and Ornamental Hairpin. The second box set contained Children in the Wind,
Nobuko, Introspection Tower and Four Seasons of Children. In 2009, a Criterion Collection box set of four of his films (corresponding to the first Shochiku set) was released in the Region 1 format.

References

External links
 

Japanese film directors
1903 births
1966 deaths
20th-century Japanese screenwriters